Progressivism in South Korea is broadly associated with social democracy, cultural progressivism and left-wing nationalism. South Korea's "progressivism" is often used in a similar sense to 'South Korean Left' or 'leftist'.

Historically, there have been communist forces, but most of them have been powerless in South Korean politics.

History

Hyukshinkye 
South Korea's early left-wing forces were mainly divided into 'communist' and 'non-communist'.

At that time, South Korean non-communist leftists were mainly called Hyukshinkye. At that time, it was politically repressed by both centre-right liberal and far-right ultra-conservatives. In particular, the Korean War led to a significant weakening as some of the Hyukshinkye were also driven to communism. After the forced dissolution of the Progressive Party led by Cho Bong-am in 1958, it virtually collapsed politically.

Progressive parties, including the United Socialist Party led by Kim Chul, continued the tradition of Hyukshinkye, but its power was minimal, and since the 1980s, Hyukshinkyes tradition has been completely cut off from power as Kim Chul and other key figures have shifted to pro-military conservative stances.

PD and NL 
The United States remained silent about the massacres in Gwangju by new-military coup forces in the 1980s, and backed the Chun Doo-hwan government. This served as an opportunity for some of the democratization movement forces in South Korea to develop anti-American sentiment. As a result, some of South Korea's moderate liberal pro-democratization activists gradually accepted socialism and became more left-wing. During this period, the left-wing movement in South Korea was largely divided into Minjungminju-wing and Minjokhaebang-wing. After the collapse of the Cold War in the 1990s, they moderated their tendencies than in the past to form a political party named Democratic Force.

PD was a Western-style leftist party, influenced by American liberalism, social democracy and Soviet communism, while NL was a left-wing nationalist party that mixed South Korean indigenous ideas, radical reunificationism and social progressivism. PD and NL are political terms that refer to the two pillars of South Korea's progressive camp and are still frequently used today. As of now, the representative PD-affiliated progressive party is the Justice Party, and the representative NL-affiliated progressive party is the Minjung Party.

Shinjwapa 

After the collapse of the Soviet Union in the 1990s, the New Left movement in Europe and the United States and postmodernist discourse became known, creating a Shinjwapa in South Korea. They advocate youth rights, LGBT rights and feminism. Currently, South Korea's representative Shinjwapa parties include the Green Party and Basic Income Party.

Socialism in South Korea 

South Korea's 'legitimate' socialist movement is considered part of South Korean progressivism. But not all progressives are socialists, so the two need to be distinguished.

Progressive parties

Gujwapa (Old Left)

Communist or far-left socialist 
 Workers' Party of South Korea (1946–1953; banned)
 Anti-Imperialist National Democratic Front → National Democratic Front of South Korea → Anti-Imperialist National Democratic Front (1969–; banned)
 Socialist Revolutionary Workers' Party → Labor Party (2016–2022; unregistered; merged)
 People's Democracy Party (2016–)

Hyukshinkye (Innovation-faction) 
 Preparatory Committee for National Construction → People's Party of Korea → People's Labor Party (1945–1950)
 Socialist Party (1951–1953)
 Progressive Party (1956–1958; banned)
 United Socialist Party of Korea (1961–1967; banned 1961–1966)

Minjungminju (PD) 
 The People's Party (1990–1992)
 People's Victory 21 → Democratic Labor Party (1997–2011)
 Youth Progressive Party → Socialist Party → Hope Socialist Party → Korea Socialist Party → Socialist Party (1998–2012)
 New Progressive Party (2008–2012)
 Unified Progressive Party (2011–2012)
 Progressive Justice Party → Justice Party (2012–) - However, there are a few Minjokhaebang and Shinjwapa factions in the Justice Party.
 Labor Party (2013–)
 Socialist Revolutionary Workers' Party → Labor Party (2016–2022; unregistered;  merged)

Minjokhaebang (NL) 
 People's Victory 21 → Democratic Labor Party (1997–2011)
 Unified Progressive Party (2011–2014; banned)
 People's United Party (2016–2017)
 New People's Party (2017)
 Minjung Party → Progressive Party (2017–)

Shinjwapa (New Left) 
 Green Social Democrats (2004)
 Green Peace Party (2002–2004)
 Social Democratic Party of Korea (2002–2004)
 Green Party Korea (2012–)
 Future Party (2017–)
 Basic Income Party (2020-)

Progressive-liberal 
 Progressive Party (1956–1958)
 People's Party (1988)
 Hankyoreh Democratic Party (1988–1991)
 Popular Party (1989–1992)
 Participation Party (2010–2011)
 Unified Progressive Party (2011–2012, factions)
 Youth Party (2012)
 Justice Party (2012–)
 Peace and Justice (2018)
 Future Party (2017–)
 Basic Income Party (2020–)
 Let's Go! Environmental Party (2020–)

Progressive media 
 OhmyNews - liberal-leaning bias
 Pressian - progressive
 Voice of the People - progressive, resistance nationalism
 Yeoseong Shinmun - feminism

Progressive personalities 

 Bong Joon-ho
 Ha-Joon Chang
 
 Hong Sehwa
 Hong Seok-cheon
 Jang Hye-young
 Kwon In-sook
 Lee Hyori
 
 
 Lyuh Woon-hyung
 Rhyu Si-min
 Roh Hoe-chan
 Ryu Ho-jeong
 Pak Noja
 Shin Hae-chul
 Sim Sang-jung
 Yun Hyon-seok

Major progressive parties election results of South Korea

Presidential elections

Legislative elections

Local elections

See also 
 Conservatism in South Korea
 Feminism in South Korea
 Identity politics - One of the main factors in distinguishing between the liberal and progressive camps in South Korea. (Those who support identity politics are classified as progressives.)
 Left-wing nationalism (left-wing)
 Juchesasangpa (far-left)
 Liberalism in South Korea
 Progressive-liberalism
 LGBT rights in South Korea
 List of political parties in South Korea
 Socialism
 Democratic socialism (left-wing)
 Social democracy (centre-left to left-wing)
 Undongkwon

Notes

References 

 
Political history of South Korea
Anti-imperialism in Korea
Anti-sadaejuui
Environmentalism in South Korea
Left-wing nationalism in South Korea